Anna Leopoldovna (18 December 1718 – 19 March 1746), born Elisabeth Katharina Christine von Mecklenburg-Schwerin and also known as Anna Carlovna (А́нна Ка́рловна), was regent of Russia for just over a year (1740–1741) during the minority of her infant son Emperor Ivan VI.

Biography

Early life
Anna Leopoldovna was born Elisabeth Katharina Christine, the daughter of Karl Leopold, Duke of Mecklenburg-Schwerin, by his wife Catherine, the eldest daughter of Tsar Ivan V of Russia. Catherine's father, Ivan V, was the elder brother and co-ruler of Russia with Peter the Great, but because he was mentally challenged and unfit to rule, all the power was in the hands of Peter the Great, who was like a father to Catherine and who looked out for her interest as long as he was alive.

Elisabeth's mother Catherine was the third wife of Duke Karl Leopold, who had divorced his first two wives after very short marriages (less than two years each). Catherine was the only wife ever to bear him a living child, and Elisabeth was that single child. In 1721, when Elisabeth was three years old, her mother became pregnant a second time, but the child was stillborn. By this time, the marriage between her parents was in trouble, and in 1722, Catherine returned to the court of her uncle Peter the Great. She took her daughter with her, and Elisabeth therefore grew up in Russia, having little or no contact with her father.

In 1730, Tsar Peter II, who was the last surviving male member of the Romanov dynasty, died unwed, and his dynasty died with him. The Russian privy council debated about whom to invite to the throne, and Elisabeth's mother Catherine was one of the candidates who was considered. However, she was passed over for several reasons and the throne was offered to her younger sister, Anna Ivanovna, who became known to history as Empress Anna of Russia. The new Empress was a childless widow and Elisabeth was Catherine's only child. Her position at court was therefore an important one.

In 1733, Elisabeth converted to the Russian Orthodox Church and was given the name Anna Leopoldovna, which was a compliment to her aunt, Empress Anna, and also to her father, Karl Leopold, Duke of Mecklenburg-Schwerin. Her conversion to the orthodox faith made her acceptable as heiress to the throne, but she was never actually declared heiress by her aunt. In 1739, Anna Leopoldovna (as she was now known) was given in marriage to Anthony Ulrich (1714–1774), the second son of Ferdinand Albert, Duke of Brunswick-Wolfenbüttel. Anthony Ulrich had lived in Russia since 1733 so that he and his bride could get to know each other better. He was able to do this because he was a younger son, and it was improbable that he would be called upon to shoulder the responsibility of ruling his father's principality. Both of these circumstances clearly indicate that Empress Anna intended her niece to inherit her throne, and was laying the ground for it by selecting a husband of suitable birth and situation, and observing him at close quarters for several years before the marriage was celebrated.

On 5 October 1740, Empress Anna adopted their newborn son Ivan and proclaimed him heir to the Russian throne. On 28 October, just a few weeks after this proclamation, the empress died, leaving directions regarding the succession and appointing her favourite Ernest Biron, Duke of Courland, as regent.

Biron, however, had made himself an object of detestation to the Russian people. After Biron threatened to exile Anna and her spouse to Germany, she had little difficulty working with Field Marshal Burkhard Christoph von Münnich to overthrow him. The coup succeeded and she assumed the regency on 8 November (O.S.), taking the title of Grand Duchess. Field Marshal Münnich personally arrested Biron in his apartment, where the formerly tyrannical Biron ingloriously begged for his life on his knees.

Regency
Anna knew little of the character of the people with whom she had to deal, knew even less of the conventions and politics of Russian government, and speedily quarrelled with her principal supporters.

According to the Dictionary of Russian History, she ordered an investigation of the garment industry when new uniforms received by the military were found to be of inferior quality. When the investigation revealed inhuman conditions she issued decrees mandating a minimum wage and maximum working hours in that industry as well as the establishment of medical facilities at every garment factory. She also presided over a brilliant victory by Russian forces at the Battle of Villmanstrand in Finland after Sweden had declared war against her Government.

She had an influential favourite, Julia von Mengden. Anna's love life took up much time, as the bisexual Anna was involved simultaneously in what were described as "passionate" affairs with the Saxon ambassador  and her lady-in-waiting Mengden. Anna's husband did his best to ignore the affairs. After becoming regent, Anton was marginalised, being forced to sleep in another palace while Anna took either Lynar, Mengden or both to bed with her. At times the grand duke would appear to complain about being "cuckolded", but he was always sent away. At one point, Anna proposed to have Lynar marry Mengden in order to unite the two people closest to her in the world together. The regent's relationship with Mengden caused much disgust in Russia, though the French historian Henri Troyat wrote that amongst the many libertines of St. Petersburg Anna's "sexual eclecticism" in having both a man and a woman as her lovers was seen as a sign of Anna's open-mindedness. More damagingly, many in the Russian elite believed that at the age of twenty-two Anna was too young and immature to be the regent of Russia and that her preoccupation with her relationships with Lynar and Mengden at the expense of governing Russia made her a danger to the state.

Troyat described Anna as an "indolent day-dreamer" who spent her mornings reading novels in bed, only got up in the afternoon, liked to wander around her apartment barely dressed with her hair undone, and was principally interested in reading novels. Anna's preference for handing out government jobs to Baltic German aristocrats caused much resentment on the part of the ethnic Russian nobility who not for the first nor last time complained that a disproportionate number of Baltic Germans were holding high office.

Later life
In December 1741, Elizabeth, the daughter of Peter the Great, excited the guards to revolt, having already become a favourite of theirs. The coup overcame the insignificant opposition and was supported by the ambassadors of France and Sweden, owing to the pro-British and pro-Austrian policies of Anna's government. The French ambassador in St. Petersburg, the marquis de La Chétardie, was deeply involved in planning Elizabeth's coup and bribed numerous officers of the Imperial Guard into supporting the coup.

The victorious regime first imprisoned the family in the fortress of Dünamünde near Riga and then exiled them to Kholmogory on the Northern Dvina river. Anna eventually died of puerperal fever on 19 March 1746, nine days after the birth of her son Alexei, after more than four years in prison. Her family continued in prison for many years more. A further eighteen years were to pass before her son, Ivan VI, was murdered in Shlisselburg Fortress on 16 July 1764, while her husband Anthony Ulrich died in Kholmogory on 4 May 1774 after spending a further decade in prison. Her remaining four children (Ekaterina, Elizaveta, Peter and Alexei) were released from prison into the custody of their aunt, the Danish queen dowager Juliana Maria of Brunswick-Wolfenbüttel, on 30 June 1780 and settled in Jutland, where they lived in comfort under house arrest in Horsens for the rest of their lives under the guardianship of Juliana and at the expense of Catherine the Great. The eldest of them had been only months old when she and her family had been placed in prison; the other three had been born in captivity. They were therefore not used to social life, and even after gaining freedom, they made little or no contact with people outside their own small "court" of some forty to fifty people, all Danish except for the priest. None of them ever married or left progeny.

Family

Anna Leopoldovna had the following children:

 Ivan VI (1740–1764) (reigning Emperor 1740–1741)
 Catherine Antonovna of Brunswick (1741–1807) (released to house arrest in Horsens in Denmark in 1780)
 Elizabeth Antonovna of Brunswick (1743–1782) (released to house arrest in Horsens in Denmark in 1780)
 Peter Antonovich of Brunswick (1745–1798) (released to house arrest in Horsens in Denmark in 1780)
 Alexei Antonovich of Brunswick (1746–1787) (released to house arrest in Horsens in Denmark in 1780)

Ancestry

Notes

References
 

 
 

Attribution

External links

  – Historical reconstruction "The Romanovs". StarMedia. Babich-Design(Russia, 2013)

1718 births
1746 deaths
Regents of Russia
18th-century women rulers
House of Mecklenburg-Brunswick-Romanov
Deaths in childbirth
House of Mecklenburg-Schwerin
Duchesses of Mecklenburg-Schwerin
Converts to Eastern Orthodoxy from Lutheranism
Burials at the Annunciation Church of the Alexander Nevsky Lavra
Daughters of monarchs